The Center of Contemporary Architecture (C:CA) was founded in Moscow in 2001 by the Russian Academy for Architectural and Building Science, Moscow Architectural Institute (MArchI), Moscow Art History Institute and Architectural Gallery as a cultural non-governmental organization.

C:CA is focusing its attention on the quality of current architecture when everything is run by ruthless rules of the real estate market. C:CA aims to create a new vibrant informational structure, that would help the development of the Russian architecture and its incorporation into the world culture process.

The main C:CA tasks are:
 to support of the innovative ways in Russian architecture
 to stimulate the creative potential of Russian architects
 to draw public attention to architectural problems
 to spread currently absent knowledge of architectural masterpieces in the global architectural information exchange
 to develop international professional connections, supporting the architectural community of Russian province.

C:CA is a  non-governmental and non profit organization, supported by Ford Foundation and other organizational and private sponsors. Irina Korobina heads C:CA since 2001, when she was appointed as a Director.

Initiatives

Architecture on TV
This one of priority directions of activity C:CA activity. Within four years C:CA run out the weekly TV show "Architectural gallery", author Irina Korobina. Broadcast on Cultural  TV Channe.
150 episodes have run as part of the series in the last four years, focusing on such issues as urban development analysis of European cities (especially Moscow), portraits of the world’s and Russia’s star architects, information on architectural events in Moscow and international events such as the Venice Biennale and the Pritzker Prize, a report on the most important buildings of the 1920s.

External links
 C:CA / Center of contemporary architecture official website

References

Architecture organizations
Organizations based in Moscow
Organizations established in 2001
2001 establishments in Russia
Russian Academy of Architecture and Construction Sciences
Non-profit organizations based in Russia